The women's javelin throw event at the 1994 World Junior Championships in Athletics was held in Lisbon, Portugal, at Estádio Universitário de Lisboa on 20 and 22 July.  An old specification 600g javelin was used.

Medalists

Results

Final
22 July

Qualifications
20 Jul

Group A

Group B

Participation
According to an unofficial count, 30 athletes from 23 countries participated in the event.

References

Javelin throw
Javelin throw at the World Athletics U20 Championships